Gravelbourg Airport  is located  southwest of Gravelbourg, Saskatchewan, Canada.

See also 
List of airports in Saskatchewan

References 

Registered aerodromes in Saskatchewan
Gravelbourg No. 104, Saskatchewan